The 2003–04 season was Sevilla FC's 114th season in existence and the club's third consecutive season in the top flight of Spanish football. In addition to the domestic league, Sevilla participated in this season's edition of the Copa del Rey.

Players

Competitions

Overview

La Liga

League table

Results summary

Results by round

Matches

Copa del Rey

References

Sevilla FC seasons
Sevilla